The 1972 United States presidential election in Indiana took place on November 7, 1972. All fifty states and the District of Columbia were part of the 1972 United States presidential election. State voters chose 13 electors to the Electoral College, who voted for president and vice president.

Indiana was won by the Republican nominees, incumbent President Richard Nixon of California and his running mate Vice President Spiro Agnew of Maryland. Nixon and Agnew defeated the Democratic nominees, Senator George McGovern of South Dakota and his running mate U.S. Ambassador Sargent Shriver of Maryland.

Nixon carried Indiana with 66.11% of the vote to McGovern's 33.34%, a victory margin of 32.77% as well as the best Republican performance in Indiana history. Although Indiana is one of the most reliable Republican states in the country, this is the only occasion where a Republican candidate (indeed, where any Presidential candidate) carried every county in the state. , this is the last time a Republican won Democratic-leaning Lake County in the northwestern corner of the state.

Results

Results by county

See also
 United States presidential elections in Indiana

References

Indiana